Public Agenda is a national, nonprofit, nonpartisan research and public engagement organization dedicated to strengthening democracy and expanding opportunity for all Americans. Over the years, it has focused on many issues of concern to the public, most notably K-12 education, higher education  and health care, as well as criminal justice reform, immigration, energy and other issues.

Based in New York City, the organization was founded in 1975 by social scientist Daniel Yankelovich and Cyrus Vance, who served as United States Secretary of State from 1977 to 1980.

According to Caroline L. Gilson of DePauw University, "The audience for Public Agenda Online is wide-ranging: from researchers and policy-makers to concerned citizens and activists. For an academic audience, this site serves as a starting point for students exploring a topic who want to understand how the public weighs in on key issues".

Recent work 
Recent initiatives includes "Hidden Common Ground", which seeks to discover and amplify common ground among the public on solutions to politically polarized issues, and "Next-Generation Community Engagement", which offers communities tools, training and other supports that enhance local democracy and civic engagement.

Controversy 

Bloggers have sometimes criticized the organization for right or left-leaning research.

Notes

External links
 Official web page

Non-profit organizations based in New York City
Nonpartisan organizations in the United States